The War Powers Act of 1941, also known as the First War Powers Act, was an American emergency law that increased Federal power during World War II. The act was signed by U.S. President Franklin D. Roosevelt and put into law on December 18, 1941, less than two weeks after the Japanese attack on Pearl Harbor. The act was similar to the Departmental Reorganization Act of 1917 as it was signed shortly before the U.S. engaged in a large war and increased the powers of the president's U.S. Executive Branch.

The act gave the President enormous authority to execute World War II in an efficient manner. The president was authorized to reorganize the executive branch, independent government agencies, and government corporations for the war cause.  With the act, the President was allowed to censor mail and other forms of communication between the United States and foreign countries. The act and all changes created by its power were to remain intact until six months after the end of the war at which time, the act would become defunct.

Three months after passing the first, the Second War Powers Act was passed on March 27, 1942. This further strengthened the executive branch powers towards executing World War II. This act allowed the acquisition, under condemnation if necessary, of land for military or naval purposes. Some provisions of the Hatch Act of 1939 were also suspended which reduced naturalization standards for aliens within the U.S. Armed Forces. In addition, it created methods for war-related production contracting along with adjusting several other aspects of government affairs. The Second War Powers Act repealed the confidentiality of census data, allowing the FBI to use this information to round up Japanese-Americans.

Under Secretary of War Robert P. Patterson retroactively delegated his authority from the President under the War Powers Act of 1941 to Leslie Groves for the Manhattan Project. The authority, given in a memorandum to Groves dated April 17, 1944, was retroactive to September 1, 1942. The written delegation was only given in 1944 when Grove's deputy Kenneth Nichols was about to sign a large contract with Du Pont, and it was found that he only had a low delegated authority, as Nichols' higher authority for the Manhattan Project had only been given verbally by General Styer to his predecessor Colonel James C. Marshall.

See also
 Naval Act of 1938
 Office of Alien Property Custodian
 Office of War Mobilization
 Two-Ocean Navy Act
 United States Office of War Information
 War Powers Act (disambiguation)
 War Shipping Administration
 Executive Order 9066

Notes
 First War Powers Act, 55 Stat. 838, House Bill 6233, December 18, 1941
 Second War Powers Act, 56 Stat. 176, Senate Bill 2208, March 27, 1942

References

External links
 
 
 

United States federal government administration legislation
United States federal defense and national security legislation
1941 in the United States
1941 in military history
World War II legislation
Emergency laws in the United States
76th United States Congress